Richard Chandler (died 1810) was a wealthy wool-stapler of Gloucester.

In 1750, he had Winston Hall built for him in Constitution Walk, Gloucester, now a grade II* listed building. The house remained in the Chandler family until 1876. He was one of the original subscribers to the Gloucester and Sharpness Canal in 1792.

His will is held by the National Archives in Kew.

References 

Gloucester
English merchants
Year of birth missing
1810 deaths